Alexander José Escobar [ess-COE-bar] (born September 6, 1978) is a former Major League Baseball outfielder.

Career
At the end of the season, he was traded to the Indians as part of an eight-player deal that sent Roberto Alomar to the Mets. Escobar missed the entire  season after tearing his left anterior cruciate ligament (ACL) during Spring Training. In , he recovered from a slow start at Triple-A Buffalo Bisons collecting 24 home runs and 78 runs batted in￼ and looked strong for the Tribe in September and played in 28 games.

In the minors, Escobar was an All-Star in the 'AAA' International, 'AA' Eastern and 'AA' South Atlantic leagues, and he also was selected by Baseball America in the 1998 All-Stars team. Escobar was demoted by the Nationals during Spring Training after hitting just .103 (3-for-29) with two RBIs. He said he was not getting enough playing time in spring training. "I'm not swinging the bat. I have to work my way back," Escobar said. "I'm getting used to being on the field every day. It's a combination of everything." Baseball America rated him as a top prospect for three years,

See also
List of players from Venezuela in Major League Baseball

References

External links
, or Pura Pelota (Venezuelan Winter League)

1978 births
Living people
Binghamton Mets players
Buffalo Bisons (minor league) players
Capital City Bombers players
Caribes de Anzoátegui players
Cleveland Indians players
Columbus Clippers players
Gulf Coast Mets players
Gulf Coast Nationals players
Harrisburg Senators players
Kingsport Mets players
Major League Baseball players from Venezuela
Major League Baseball right fielders
Navegantes del Magallanes players
New York Mets players
Norfolk Tides players
Potomac Nationals players
Sportspeople from Valencia, Venezuela
St. Lucie Mets players
Tiburones de La Guaira players
Venezuelan expatriate baseball players in the United States
Washington Nationals players